Yeo Kab-soon (Hangul: 여갑순; born May 8, 1974) is a South Korea sport shooter who competed in the 1992 Summer Olympics. She was born in Seoul.

References

1974 births
Living people
Sport shooters from Seoul
South Korean female sport shooters
ISSF rifle shooters
Shooters at the 1992 Summer Olympics
Olympic shooters of South Korea
Olympic gold medalists for South Korea
Olympic medalists in shooting
Asian Games medalists in shooting
Shooters at the 1994 Asian Games
Shooters at the 1998 Asian Games
Medalists at the 1992 Summer Olympics
Asian Games gold medalists for South Korea
Asian Games silver medalists for South Korea
Asian Games bronze medalists for South Korea
Medalists at the 1994 Asian Games
Medalists at the 1998 Asian Games
South Korean Buddhists
20th-century South Korean women
21st-century South Korean women